Marie-Louis Damotte was a French fencer. He competed in the individual épée masters event at the 1900 Summer Olympics, finishing 5th.

References

External links
 

Year of birth missing
Year of death missing
French male épée fencers
Olympic fencers of France
Fencers at the 1900 Summer Olympics
Place of death missing